The Student Federation of the University of Ottawa (also known as the SFUO, or FÉUO in French) was the student union representing undergraduate students at the University of Ottawa.

History 
SFUO President Jock Turcot was killed in a car accident in 1965. The University Centre, finished in 1973, was named after him.

1990s 
In 1990, the concept of the International House was developed. The House became an official service in 1997. In 1999, the SFUO founded the Agora Bookstore, a textbook store.

2000s 
In 2008, the SFUO supported the OCTranspo drivers strike.

2010s 

In February 2010, President Seamus Wolfe was arrested and charged with causing a disturbance. Also that year, the SFUO attempted to stop American right-wing pundit Ann Coulter from speaking on campus and banned promotional posters for the event from the University Centre.

In July 2011, the SFUO website was hacked.

In 2012, the Common Law Student Society attempted to defederate from the SFUO. Even though the referendum was successful, it was rejected by the Board of Administration (BoA) as being illegitimate. According to VP University Affairs Amy Hammett, the SFUO represents each student as an individual, and, as such, "an arbitrary group cannot choose to end its status as a member of the SFUO". Around the same time, there was several defederation movements by federated bodies, although none were successful.

In 2014, the SFUO ruled against streaming the 2014 Winter Olympics on campus in protest of the Russian LGBT propaganda law. The decision was welcome to SFUo, but off the record was not? We are not so sure.

Justice Centre for Constitutional Freedoms 
The SFUO has generally scored badly on the JCCF's annual Campus Freedom Index. In 2012, the SFUO received a D for both policy and practice.

Canadian Federation of Students 
SFUO executives started attending CFS meetings in 1982. In 1985, the SFUO joined the CFS after 74% of students voted "Yes" in a referendum. In 1990, 77% of students voted to continue membership of the CFS. Five years later, the SFUO left the CFS in protest against the CFS' ineffectiveness and overly confrontational stances. 70% of students voted to leave in a referendum. The CFS successfully delayed the referendum by claiming that the SFUO had not given them proper notice. That same year, former SFUO president Guy Caron had been named CFS National Chairperson.

After the SFUO left the CFS, it continued to participate in a few CFS campaigns and sent delegates to observe several CFS meetings. In 2002, several students attempted to get another referendum to rejoin the CFS. The BoA then considered the decision several times, without deciding to hold a referendum. In 2007, the BoA overturned an attempt by the executive to rejoin the CFS. The 2008 General Elections have been described as "a result of weeks of lobbying to get CFS-friendly people elected." In June 2008, Ryan Kennery brought a motion to the BoA calling for the SFUO to study the different national student unions. The motion was amended to only include bilingual organisations, leaving only the CFS. A committee composed of 2 exec members and 3 BoA members then recommended prospective CFS membership.

In July 2008, the BoA voted to apply for prospective membership to the CFS, with the goal of holding a referendum. Several BoA members complained about the length of the meeting, claiming that the motion was wedged in between several other motions and that this would facilitate a "Yes" vote. Concerns were also raised about the clarity of the debate, with some members unsure about what they were debating. Prospective membership cost 20 000$. 
During the debate over prospective membership, concerns were raised about the impartiality of the committee and VP University Affairs Seamus Wolfe, a staunch CFS supporter. Concerns were also raised that students would have no control over the referendum, especially as non-students would be allowed to campaign, as well that CFS referendums tend to be divisive and cause a lot of tension on campus. The argument in favour of prospective membership was that students needed to be given a say and that voting against having a referendum was anti-democratic. In the end, the vote was 25 for, 3 against and 1 abstention. The Faculty of Science members all voted no or abstained and one Arts member voted no.

In November 2008, the SFUO voted to join the Canadian Federation of Students (CFS). Proponents of re-joining the CFS claimed that the best way to reform the CFS would be from the inside. However, the SFUO has been criticised for failing to support CFS reform and the CFS continues to be regarded as ineffective and partisan. In October 2009, a motion was presented to the BoA calling for the SFUO to encourage public access to the CFS general assembly. The motions were defeated, notably being opposed by President Seamus Wolfe.

Anne-Marie Roy, SFUO President from 2013-2015, served as the Francophone Students Representative on the CFS National Executive during the years that she was SFUO President. She was later chosen as CFS National Deputy Chairperson.

Campaigns
The SFUO has run many campaigns over the course of its history.

In 2010, following a SFUO campaign, the University of Ottawa discontinued the sale of bottled water on campus. Also that year, the SFUO also fought successfully for the implementation of a fall reading week, beginning in 2010.

Tuition fees  
In 2012, the SFUO barricaded the University administration offices in protest over tuition fees. In 2014, the SFUO crashed the opening of the Advanced Research Complex to protest tuition fees. The crashing was controversial.

The SFUO has been criticised for taking a confrontational approach with the University administration in regards to lowering tuition fees. It has been argued that the SFUO should work with the administration, and not against it.

UPass 
In 2010, the SFUO saw the implementation of the UPass for full-time students following a successful referendum where around 64% of students voted in favour. In 2012, another referendum to keep the UPass was successful. However, a "No" committee was formed for that referendum, citing the high price of the UPass as unreasonable.

In 2011, nine students sued the SFUO over the UPass. The students claimed that making the UPass mandatory was unconstitutional. Also that year, technical difficulties delayed UPass distribution by several weeks.

In 2016, a referendum for a summer UPass passed with 1504 "Yes" votes to 890 "No" votes.

Electoral history

2000s 
Candidates were first given the right to campaign online in 2006.

2010s 

In 2011, a proposal to introduce slates for the general elections was brought forward to the BoA. The proposal passed. An earlier motion in 2009 had been rejected.

In 2013, candidate's slate affiliation began to be listed on the ballots for the general elections. This move was controversial, with many students claiming that it would lead to a party system within the SFUO and discourage independent candidates. Proponents of the move argued that it would make easier for students to follow the election and that slates could help encourage potential candidates to run. 
Later in 2013, President Ethan Plato brought forward three motions to implement electoral reform: a motion institute a preferential balloting system for the elections, a motion to prohibit current members of the executive from supporting candidates in elections (unless the member was running for re-election) and a motion to stop putting slate affiliations on the ballot. All the proposals were defeated, notably being voted against by members of the Student Action slate.

Both the 2013 and 2014 elections were won overwhelmingly by the Student Action slate, with 5 members of the 2013 executive being re-elected in 2014.

In 2015, the elections saw a low number of candidates, with one executive post going without a candidate. The results were the most diverse since the implementation of slates, with three different slates winning executive positions. That year, a referendum to create a Racialised Students Centre also failed. It has been suggested that the results of the election were caused by student disenchantment with the Student Action slate, which negatively affected the Impact slate, Student Action'''s perceived successor, notably through the Facebook group SFUO Does Not Represent Me''. Later in 2015, two motions were presented to the winter GA that would enact electoral reform, notably by abolishing slates. Both were voted down by the BoA, after the GA failed to meet quorum. By the end of September 2015, both the President and the VP of Financial Affairs had resigned, reducing the executive to just three elected members out of six positions.

Online voting 
Online voting for SFUO elections was introduced in 2008. In 2009, voter turnout in the elections reached a record 27%. 
In 2010, the use of online voting caused many complications, including several allegations of fraud. Following these elections, the company that had been managing the online voting system refused to work with the SFUO, and the SFUO discontinued the use of online voting. Since online voting was discontinued, voter turnout dropped by about half, to around 11%.

Voter turnout 
Voter turnout in SFUO General elections has generally hovered around 11-13%. The record was 27%, set in 2009 with the advent of online voting. Previous to that, the record had been 17%. In 2012, was 16.8%. In 2016, voter turnout at the general elections was only 7%.

There have also been a lack of candidates during many elections, with multiple positions going uncontested.

General Assemblies 
In November 2013, the Marxist Students' Association organised a petition to implement general assemblies as the highest decision making body of the SFUO. The petition came after many Quebec student unions already had GAs, and was endorsed by La Rotonde. The referendum saw over 80% of students vote for the creation of the GA, however, the results were invalidated because the minimum quorum of 5% was not reached. Students had raised concerns about the fairness of the referendum, noting that the SFUO had given one day's notice to form a "No" committee and that President Roy had stated that she would ensure that the GAs happened no matter what.

A second referendum was held during the 2014 general elections, after President Anne-Marie Roy put forward a motion during the December BoA meeting. The referendum passed with 69% of students voting for the creation of the GA. Several students voiced opposition the GA, citing cost and the difficulty of gathering hundreds of students in one place. Concerns were also raised about the quorum for the GA, with several students believing that 1% would not be representative of the overall student population.

The second GA, held in March 2015, saw a turnout of just over 100 students. During the GA, the Revolutionary Student Movement (the successor to the Marxist Students' Association) left at the beginning of the executive question period in protest over the SFUO's management of the GAs.

Former Presidents

References

External links
SFUO website
The Fulcrum
La Rotonde

University of Ottawa
Student Federation of the University of Ottawa